Niram Maaratha Pookkal is an Indian Tamil-language soap opera, starring Mohammed Azeem with Deepa Jayan and Nishma. It started on Zee Tamil on 9 October 2017 on Monday to Friday at 14:00 (IST). From Monday 12 August 2019, the show was moved to Monday to Friday at 1:30pm (IST). It ended on 21 February 2020after 593 episodes. The show was produced by the actress Neelima Rani with her husband Esai Vanan under Esai Pictures. It examines a love triangle.

Synopsis
It is a story about a village girl Venmathi, who is in love with her teenage crush Ram, who is far away in a city and is in love with city-based fashionable girl, Keerthy. Circumstances forces the hero to marry the heroine. The struggle of the heroine to safeguard from revealing herself to the hero and the hero's struggle, between the two women forms the crux of the story.

Cast

Main
Mohammed Azeem as Ram and Krish (Ramkrishnan) (Venmathi's and Keerthy's husband)
 Nishma Chengappa as Keerthy (Ram's second wife)
 Deepa Jayan as Venmathi Ram (Ram's firsst wife)

Supporting
 Dhakshayini as Ram's mother
 Geethanjali as Jyothi
 Swapna as Ram's sister
 Navin Victor as Anbu
 Ashritha Sreedas as Roja
 Jerom as Roja's Would Be
 Yuvanraj Nethran as Devaraj
 Ashwin Karthik as Vasu
 Babitha as Anbu's mother
 Mithun Raj as Mahesh
 Murali Krish as Moorthy
 Gowthami Vembunathan as Muthulakshmi
 Dharish Jayaseelan as Inspector Sathish

Former
 Murali as Ram and Krish (replaced by Mohammad Azeem)
 Vishnupriya as Venmathi (replaced by Deepa Jayan)
 Ashmitha as Vemathi (replaced by Vishnupriya)
 Murali Krish as Murali
 Shyam as Anbu (replaced By Navin Victor)

Production

Development
The show was produced by Rani, producing a series for the first time with her husband Esai Vanan and also this is her debut to produce the TV serial. After this series ended, she producedthe new series Endrendrum Punnagai, also on Zee Tamil.

Series crew
 Co-director: E. Ravisuba and Ashok
 Dialogue: S. Venkat
 Co-screenwriter: Jo. Jorge
 Background music: Hari
 Editor: S. Mahesh
 Location: Muttom, Kanyakumari and Nagar Kovil among surroundings

Title song
This title was taken from a 1979 Niram Maaratha Pookkal movie starring Sudhakar, Raadhika and Vijayan. The English meaning of this title is Flowers that don't change colors.

Airing history

References

External links
 

Zee Tamil original programming
Tamil-language romance television series
2017 Tamil-language television series debuts
Tamil-language television shows
Television shows set in Tamil Nadu
2020 Tamil-language television series endings